Golden Eagle Award may refer to:

Golden Eagle Award (Russia), accolade by the National Academy of Motion Pictures Arts and Sciences of Russia
China TV Golden Eagle Award, main TV awards in China
CINE Golden Eagle Award, award for American non-theatrical film and video productions
Filmörnen (Golden Eagle Award), first prize in the Swedish short film festival Filmörnen
Golden Eagle Award (San Diego), a statuette presented to winners at the San Diego International Film Festival